The Fifth Republic Movement (Spanish: Movimiento V [Quinta] República, MVR) was a socialist political party in Venezuela. It was founded in July 1997, following a national congress of the Revolutionary Bolivarian Movement-200, to support the candidacy of Hugo Chávez, the former President of Venezuela, in the 1998 presidential election. The "Fifth Republic" refers to the fact that in 1997 the Republic of Venezuela was the fourth in Venezuelan history, and the Movement aimed to re-found the Republic through a constituent assembly. Following Chávez' 1998 election victory, this took place in 1999, leading to the 1999 Constitution of Venezuela.

At the legislative elections on 30 July 2000, the party won 91 out of 165 seats in the National Assembly. On the same day, Hugo Chávez was elected president in the presidential elections with 59.5% of votes. In the parliamentary elections of 4 December 2005, the party won 114 out of 167 seats, with allied parties winning the remaining seats.

In December 2006 and January 2007, the party started its dissolution, to form the proposed United Socialist Party of Venezuela (PSUV). It merged into the PSUV on 20 October 2007.

Foundation
The MVR was founded in July 1997 to support the electoral aims of the Revolutionary Bolivarian Movement-200. In the early years after his release, Chávez considered the possibility of another coup attempt, but with the prospects appearing slim, some advisers, notably Luis Miquilena, urged him to reconsider his scepticism of the elections. In July 1997, Chávez registered the new Fifth Republic Movement with the National Electoral Council.

Aims
The party was committed to the Bolivarian Revolution and claimed to be the political voice of the country's poor. The MVR also pursued radical anti-americanism and Marxism. Party leaders often had contacts with Fidel Castro and the Cuban Communist Party, for example.

Primary elections

The Movement for a Fifth Republic (MVR), formerly Venezuela's governing party, was the first political party in Venezuela to incorporate primary elections as the primary method for selecting its candidates.

Led by President Hugo Chávez, but involving organizations and movements that are broader than the MVR, the question of how to select MVR candidates had been controversial. Until the implementation of this primary mechanism, candidates tended to be hand-picked by the leadership of the parties. The result had been that a number of those elected on MVR platforms were distrusted by the masses, and in some cases proved to be disloyal.

The issue came to a head in the lead-up to the regional elections of October 2005. Despite opposition from within the grassroots movements, a candidate list was drawn up by the leadership of various MVR allied parties. The decision not to hold primaries was justified by the claim that there wasn't time. After the elections, Chavez stated that in the future, primaries would be held to empower the rank and file to select candidates.

Provisions introduced into the constitution and adopted by referendum in 1999 already mean that elected officials can have their mandate revoked half-way through their term if 20% of their electors sign a petition requesting a fresh election.

A total of 2.4 million people voted in the MVR primaries. More than 5200 candidates were pre-selected to compete for the 5618 positions up for grabs in the August elections. The remaining 418 positions will go to other pro-Chavez parties. However, other pro-Chavez groups have publicly criticized the MVR for taking these positions.

The use of Venezuelan history
Venezuela historiography recognizes four "republics," or major regime changes, since the country was founded in 1811. The First Republic, known as the "Venezuelan Confederation," lasted until 1812. The Second Republic is the restored republican regime that was instituted by Simón Bolívar after his Admirable Campaign in 1813, and which lasted until 1814. The Third Republic refers to the period after 1816 in which various patriot guerrilla bands joined under Bolívar's leadership in the Llanos of Venezuela and set up an independent government. This process culminated in the Congress of Angostura, but shortly thereafter the Congress declared Venezuela to be part of a larger Gran Colombia. Gran Colombia lasted only a decade and at its dissolution Venezuela became once again the "Republic of Venezuela," which is considered the start of the Fourth Republic.  In 1864, the country was then restructured into the "United States of Venezuela", before reverting once again to the name "Republic of Venezuela" in 1953. Although both periods began with the implementation of new constitutions (the fourth and twenty-fourth constitutions, respectively), both have been deemed by Venezuelan historiography as a continuation of the Fourth Republic.

Since Chávez's election to the Presidency in 1998, the country has been known as the "Bolivarian Republic of Venezuela", signaling Chávez' desires to usher in a new era of politics and government. This unique "Bolivarian" government is the "Fifth Republic" referred to in the party's title. The use of the phrase also echoes the French Fifth Republic, which was another sweeping political change to deal with political instability during decolonisation.

Dissolution
On 18 December 2006, Hugo Chávez announced plans to dissolve the party, hoping that the 23 other parties that supported his government would follow suit and collectively form the proposed United Socialist Party of Venezuela.

Elections the MVR participated in:
 1998 Venezuelan presidential election, 2000 Venezuelan presidential election, 2006 Venezuelan presidential election
 1998 Venezuelan parliamentary election, 2000 Venezuelan parliamentary election, 2005 Venezuelan parliamentary election
 1998 Venezuelan regional elections, 2000 Venezuelan regional elections, 2004 Venezuelan regional elections
 April 1999 Venezuelan constitutional referendum, December 1999 Venezuelan constitutional referendum, 2004 Venezuelan recall referendum

Leaders of MVR
 Hugo Chávez
 Francisco Ameliach
 Juan Barreto
 Diosdado Cabello
 Jesse Chacón
 Cilia Flores
 Willian Lara
 Nicolás Maduro
 Tarek William Saab
 Luis Tascón
 Iris Varela
 Darío Vivas

Election results

Presidential

Parliament (National Assembly)

References

External links

Bolivarian Revolution
Defunct political parties in Venezuela
Hugo Chávez
Political parties disestablished in 2007
Political parties established in 1997
Socialist parties in Venezuela
United Socialist Party of Venezuela